Maxim Jakubowski (born 1944) is a crime, erotic, science fiction and rock music writer and critic.

Jakubowski was born in 1944 in England to Russian-British and Polish parents, but raised in France. Jakubowski has also lived in Italy and has traveled extensively. Jakubowski edited the science fiction anthologies Twenty Houses of the Zodiac (1979), for the 37th World Science Fiction Convention (Seacon '79) in Brighton, and Travelling Towards Epsilon, an anthology of French science fiction. He also contributed a short story to that anthology.

Murder One Bookstore
He has worked in book publishing for many years, which he left to open the Murder One bookshop, the UK's first specialist crime and mystery bookstore. The store closed in 2009, a victim of the internet according to Jakubowski.

Novels
His novels include It's You that I Want to Kiss, Because She Thought She Loved Me, The State of Montana, On Tenderness Express, Kiss Me Sadly, Confessions of a Romantic Pornographer and I Was Waiting for You. His short story collections are Life in the World of Women, Fools for Lust and the collaborative American Casanova. He is a regular broadcaster on British TV and radio and was voted the fourth Sexiest Writer of 2007 in a poll on the Crimespace website. Ekaterina and the Night were published in 2011 and combined crime with erotica, as does his latest novel 'The Louisiana Republic' (2018).

For many years, Jakubowski was Chair of the Arthur C. Clarke Award and is now chair and judge for the Crime Writers' Association International Dagger; he is also on the committee of the Crime Writers' Association and a frequent commentator on radio and TV. He is currently  Chair of the Crime Writers' Association.

In October 2019, he was awarded the CWA Red Herrings Award for lifetime achievement. He has also won the Karel Award for contribution to European science fiction and the Anthony Award at the Toronto Bouchercon for a best non-fiction book of the year for 'One Hundred Great Detectives'

In 2020, he will act as Executive Producer for the 'Factory' TV series, based on the novels of Derek Raymond, being produced by the FX Network (The Living Dead) and Hardy, Son and Baker (Taboo and A Christmas Carol).

Other writings
He wrote the short story "Un Avocat pour Dolorès" under the pen name of "Adam Barnett-Foster".

Jakubowski also wrote a number of books on rock music during the 1980s.

He is also a well-known critic and reviewer, having written a crime review column for Time Out, London for 10 years and the Guardian for a further 11 years, ending in 2010. His column then moved online to Love Reading and has been since 2017 on Crime Time. His non-fiction book 'Following the Detectives' was shortlisted for several awards in the mystery field.

It was revealed in The Guardian in January 2020 that he was one of two authors behind the pseudonymous Vina Jackson, who between 2010 and 2011 wrote a series of ten bestselling romantic erotica novels under the 'Eighty Days' brand which reached the Sunday Times bestseller list on several occasions and were published in 31 countries.

Select bibliography

As author

 with Edwards, Malcolm. The Complete Book of Science Fiction and Fantasy Lists. St Albans, Herts, UK: Granada Publishing Ltd., 1983. 350 pages. .

As editor

 Jakubowski, Maxim. Twenty Houses of the Zodiac. New English Library, 1979. 237 pages. 
 Jakubowski, Maxim. 100 Great Detectives. Carroll & Graf, 1991. 255 pages. Won 1992 Anthony Award for Best Critical Work
 Jakubowski, Maxim. London Noir. Serpent's Tail, 1994. 264 pages. Nominated 1995 Anthony Award for Best Anthology / Short Story Collection
 Jakubowski, Maxim. Past Poisons: An Ellis Peters Memorial Anthology of Historical Crime. Ibooks, Inc. Anthology edition, 2005. 356 pages. .

Anthologies of erotic fiction

 The Mammoth Book of Erotica (Carroll & Graf US and Robinson UK, originally published in 1994, revised edition published in 2000)

Anthologies of erotic photography

 The Mammoth Book of Illustrated Erotica, co-edited with Marilyn Jaye Lewis, Running Press, 2002, 
 The Mammoth Book of Erotic Photography, co-edited with Marilyn Jaye Lewis, Edition Olms, 2004,

References

External links

BDSM writers
British science fiction writers
English erotica writers
Living people
Anthony Award winners
British music critics
1944 births